Serpukhovsky (masculine), Serpukhovskaya (feminine), or Serpukhovskoye (neuter) may refer to:
Serpukhovsky District, a district of Moscow Oblast, Russia
Serpukhovskaya, a station of the Moscow Metro, Moscow, Russia